The 1939–40 Coupe de France football competition concluded with a final at the Parc des Princes stadium in Paris on May 5, 1940, between RC Paris, the winners of the previous competition, and Olympique de Marseille, winners of the 1937–1938 competition. The closing stages of the competition were held against a backdrop of war against Germany, with the invasion of France imminent by the day of the final.

Paris had used 20 different players during their progression to the final, highlighting the difficulty in forming a consistent team during war-time. Only the team's captain, 20-year-old René Roulier played in every cup tie.

Both teams contained a number of naturalised players in their squads, Paris with five: goalkeeper Hiden, midfielder Jordan and centre forward Hiltl of Austria; and wingers Mathé and Weiskopf from Hungary. For their part, Marseille included a "stateless" Austrian in the form of their winger, Donnerfeld (Austria having annexed by Germany in the Anschluss of 1938), together with a naturalised former German, centre forward Heiss, and a Hungarian, centre forward Eisenhoffer, a 40-year-old veteran.

The game itself was an aggressive affair, with a player on each side dismissed from the field of play. Having taken the lead in the 16th minute through Emmanuel Aznar, Marseille conceded two goals, on the 25th minute to Paris captain Roulier, and on 70 minutes, to Mathé; Marseille claimed that both Paris goals were offside.

Match details

See also
Coupe de France 1939-1940

References

External links
Coupe de France results at Rec.Sport.Soccer Statistics Foundation
Report on French federation site

Coupe
1940
Coupe De France Final 1940
Coupe De France Final 1940
Coupe de France Final
Coupe de France Final